Lauhanvuori National Park is a national park in the Southern Ostrobothnia region of Finland, on the border of Kauhajoki and Isojoki.

The park is characterized by its pine forestland, spring brooks, and swamps.

Nature

Mountain 

The summit area was uncovered 9500 BCE when the glacier retreated, and it has never been under the water. Indeed, it was an island in the middle of the Ancylus Lake.

Flora and fauna
The summit of Lauhanvuori is lusher than its surroundings due to not having been under the sea and thus having retained its loose soil and nutrients. The hillsides are barren and infertile.

Cranes and capercaillies can be heard in the bogs during summertime. The willow grouse also inhabits the bogs. The park also has a hectare of fen, where Succisa pratensis, brown beak-sedge, carnation sedge, moor rush, Scottish asphodel, and many rare mosses grow. Lauhanvuori is the southernmost habitat of the Scottish asphodel.

See also
 List of national parks of Finland
 Protected areas of Finland

References

External links
 Outdoors.fi – Lauhanvuori National Park
 

Protected areas established in 1982
Geography of South Ostrobothnia
Tourist attractions in South Ostrobothnia
1982 establishments in Finland
National parks of Finland